Festus Patrick Tierney (July 1, 1899 – August 14, 1973) was a guard in the National Football League. Tierney split the 1922 NFL season between the Hammond Pros and the Toledo Maroons before playing the next two season with the Minneapolis Marines. He played his final season with the Milwaukee Badgers.

References

Players of American football from Saint Paul, Minnesota
Hammond Pros players
Toledo Maroons players
Minneapolis Marines players
Milwaukee Badgers players
American football offensive guards
Minnesota Golden Gophers football players
1899 births
1973 deaths